Tari is the capital of the Tari-Pori District and is the centre of Huli country in the  Hela Province of Papua New Guinea. It is the second largest settlement in the province, and accessible by road from Mendi. The town is administered under Tari Urban LLG.

Climate
Tari has a subtropical highland climate (Köppen Cfb) with heavy rainfall and mild to warm temperatures year-round.

Aviation accidents

A Cessna 206 aircraft operated by Missionary Aviation Fellowship crashed close to Tari on March 23, 2006, killing its pilot and injuring 3 passengers.
The pilot was a 42-year Swiss man who had been in PNG with the Swiss Mission for 12 years, and left a wife and four children behind. The pilot had reportedly entered the circuit area around Tari airfield and appeared to be flying well, but never made it to the runway. The three passengers were PNG nationals.

Gallery

References

Populated places in Hela Province
Provincial capitals in Papua New Guinea